The 1998–99 Ukrainian Hockey League season was the sixth season of the Ukrainian Hockey League, the top level of ice hockey in Ukraine. Eight teams participated in the league, and HC Sokil Kyiv won the championship.

Regular season

Playoffs
Semifinals
HC Sokil Kyiv - HK Kryzhynka Kyiv 2-0 on series
HC Berkut - HC Sokil Kyiv II 2-0 on series
Final
HC Sokil Kyiv - HC Berkut 3-1 on series
3rd place
HC Sokil Kyiv II - HK Kryzhynka Kyiv 2-0 on series

External links
1998-99 Standings and results. Ukrainian Ice Hockey Federation

UKHL
Ukrainian Hockey Championship seasons
Ukr